MacPhail is a surname. People with the surname include:

Agnes Macphail (1890–1954), Canadian feminist and first woman to be elected to the Canadian House of Commons
Andrew Macphail (1864–1938), Canadian physician, author, professor of medicine and soldier.
Andy MacPhail (born 1953), president of baseball operations for the Baltimore Orioles and son of the former American League president Lee MacPhail and grandson of Larry MacPhail.
Angus MacPhail (1903–1962), English screenwriter known for his work with Alfred Hitchcock; credited with the creation of the term "MacGuffin"
John MacPhail (born 1955), former Scottish footballer
Joy MacPhail, former Canadian New Democratic Party of British Columbia politician
Larry MacPhail (1890–1975), American executive and innovator in Major League Baseball
Lee MacPhail (born 1917), former administrator in Major League Baseball
Mark MacPhail (died 1989), police officer and murder victim
Robert Lloyd George MacPhail (1920–1995), Canadian politician and the 36th Lieutenant Governor of Prince Edward Island; Member of the Order of Canada
Catherine Macphail (born 1964), Scottish-born author
William S. MacPhail (fl. 1900s), namesake of the MacPhail Center for Music in Minneapolis, Minnesota
Dan Macphail, fictitious engineer of the Vital Spark

See also
 McPhail, a surname